The Roman Catholic Diocese of Reykjavík is a diocese of the Latin Church of the Roman Catholic Church which covers the whole of the country of Iceland, and numbered 14,723 Catholics as of 2022. It is directly subject to the Holy See.

History

The Apostolic Prefecture of Iceland was created in 1923 and this was elevated to an Apostolic Administration in 1929, which in turn was elevated to the status of a diocese in 1968. In 2015 the then bishop, Pierre Bürcher retired and Father Dávid Bartimej Tencer, OFM Cap., was appointed to succeed him as the fifth bishop of the diocese. The bishop of Reykjavík participates in the Scandinavian Bishops Conference.  The vicar general is Fr. Patrick Breen, rector of Landakot Cathedral, Christ the King Parish.

The Diocese of Reykjavík is a modern creation.  The medieval church was represented by the sees of Skálholt (created 1056) and Hólar (1106), but these became Lutheran during the Reformation.  (These two sees were amalgamated in 1801 into a single diocese under the Bishop of Iceland in the Lutheran Church of Iceland.)  Iceland remained without Roman Catholic prelates until the Apostolic Prefecture was established at Reykjavík in 1923.

Episcopal ordinaries

Apostolic Prefecture of Iceland 
 Martin Meulenberg, SMM (12 June 1923 – 3 August 1941)
 Jóhannes Gunnarsson, SMM (23 February 1942 – 14 October 1967)

Diocese of Reykjavík 
 Hendrik Hubert Frehen, SMM (18 October 1968 – 31 October 1986)
 Alfred James Jolson, SJ (12 December 1987 – 21 March 1994)
 Joannes Gijsen (24 May 1996 – 30 October 2007)
 Pierre Bürcher (30 October 2007 – 18 September 2015)
 Dávid Bartimej Tencer, OFM Cap. (18 September 2015 – )

Coat of arms 
The proposal of coat of arms created Marek Sobola, a heraldic specialist from Slovakia, who also made a coat of arms for the new Bishop Tencer recently. These are based on the Icelandic flag and an older stamp of the Diocese. He prepared three different variations. Then the priests, nuns and the staff at the Bishop's office, a total of 42 persons, were involved in choosing the ones they thought were best, and thus the final selection was made.

See also
Bishop of Reykjavík (Catholic)
Christ the King Cathedral, Reykjavík (Iceland)
Roman Catholicism in Iceland
Religion in Iceland
St. Thorlak Church, Reyðarfjörður

Footnotes

External links
Roman Catholic Diocese of Reykjavík 
Statistics relating to the Diocese of Reykjavik
Statistics relating to Iceland

Reykjavik
Christian organizations established in 1923
Roman Catholic dioceses and prelatures established in the 20th century
Catholic Church in Iceland